was a Japanese animator, producer, writer and director. Some of his major works include Megazone 23 and Plastic Little. He also directed several of the Queen's Blade anime series, as well as anime adaptations for I Couldn't Become a Hero, So I Reluctantly Decided to Get a Job. and Unbreakable Machine-Doll, and is known for his manga and anime productions with manga artist Satoshi Urushihara. The two along with Yoshihiro Kimura created their own production company called Earthwork. Yoshimoto died on 5 November 2021.

Filmography

Anime

Other projects

References

External links 
  
 

1966 births
2021 deaths
20th-century screenwriters
21st-century screenwriters
Anime directors
Anime screenwriters
Japanese animated film directors
Japanese animators
Japanese television directors
Male screenwriters
Manga artists from Hiroshima Prefecture